Spring Ridge Academy, is a behavioral health residential facility for female adolescents 13-17 years old. in 2023 spring ridge academy accounced on there website they had permently closed.

Background 
The campus was originally a house with a barn attached and only had one student. It is now capable of housing up to 76 girls with a facility that includes classrooms, medical areas, labs, and athletic fields and courts. Spring Ridge Academy is currently operated by Suzanne Courtney (Executive Director).

Programming 

Spring Ridge Academy describes itself as a "clinical therapeutic program with a college preparatory academic curriculum".

The program includes four phases that each student is expected to complete at their own pace. The program's average length of stay is 14 to 18 months.

Parents or guardians who have their child admitted to Spring Ridge pay tuition and fees. Medical insurance may cover part of the costs.

Extracurricular activities 

 Life skills
 Self-defense
 Digital photography
 Horseback riding
 Choral and instrumental music
 Cooking
 Ceramics
 Jewelry making
 Skiing
 Hiking
 Indoor rock climbing
 Kayaking and paddleboarding
 Swimming
 Tennis
 Mountain biking

Controversy 
In 2021, the parent of a former resident filed a lawsuit against Spring Ridge Academy, alleging causes of action for negligence and fraud, amongst other things. The mother claims that the troubled teen program used non-evidence-based treatment practices on her daughter and misrepresented the tactics the program used before she enrolled her child there. In a large group awareness training workshop, for example, girls at Spring Ridge Academy were allegedly instructed to beat their chairs with rolled-up towels containing their anger while other students screamed at them.

Other former students have claimed that the workshops at the center of the lawsuit are "abusive" and "shame-based." Former students say they had to participate in attack therapy as well.

Spring Ridge Academy has also been accused of using conversion therapy.

Other alumni have come forward alleging abuse as part of the Breaking Code Silence movement, describing the academy as a cult and as being exploitative of families. One Spring Ridge Academy alumnus was also featured in a Lifetime movie special Beyond the Headlines: Cruel Instruction, talking about the allegations of abuse in the troubled teen industry and the PTSD and anxiety that many survivors continue to live with. Spring Ridge Academy issued several in response to the lifeline movie.

References

External links
  (Spring Ridge Academy)
 Official website (New Day Rising)
 NCES website

Schools in Yavapai County, Arizona
Boarding schools in Arizona
Girls' schools in Arizona
Alternative schools in the United States
1997 establishments in Arizona
Private high schools in Arizona
Residential treatment centers
Therapeutic boarding schools in the United States